Despoina Chatzinikolaou (born 21 October 1999) is a Greek footballer who plays as a midfielder for Italian Serie B club Lazio. She has been a member of the Greece women's national team.

References

1999 births
Living people
Footballers from Athens
Greek footballers
Greek women's footballers
Women's association football midfielders
Serie A (women's football) players
Greece women's international footballers
Greek expatriate women's footballers
Greek expatriate sportspeople in Italy
Expatriate women's footballers in Italy
S.S.D. Napoli Femminile players
S.S. Lazio Women 2015 players